Joan Elizabeth London (born 1948) is an Australian author of short stories, screenplays and novels.

Biography 
She graduated from the University of Western Australia having studied English and French, has taught English as a second language and is a bookseller. She lives in Fremantle, Western Australia.

London is the author of two collections of stories. The first, Sister Ships, won The Age Book of the Year (1986), and the second, Letter to Constantine, won the Steele Rudd Award and the West Australian Premier's Award for Fiction (both in 1994). The two were published together as The New Dark Age. She has published three novels, Gilgamesh, The Good Parents and The Golden Age.

She was awarded the Patrick White Award and the Nita Kibble Literary Award in 2015.

Bibliography

Short stories
Sister Ships (1986)
Letter to Constantine (1993)
New Dark Age (2004)

Novels
Gilgamesh (2001)
The Good Parents (2008)
The Golden Age (2014)

Critical studies and reviews of London's work
 Review of The Golden Age.
Book Review (15 June 2016).Kirkus Reviews. Review of The Golden Age.

Awards and nominations
 1986: The Age Book of the Year Book of the Year and Fiction Award for Sister Ships
 1986: Western Australia Week Literary Award for Sister Ships
 1994: Steele Rudd Award for Letter to Constantine
 1994: Western Australian Premier's Book Awards for Letter to Constantine
 2002: The Age Book of the Year Fiction Award for Gilgamesh
 2002: Miles Franklin Award Shortlisted for Gilgamesh
 2002: New South Wales Premier's Literary Awards Shortlisted for Gilgamesh
 2003: Tasmania Pacific Rim Region Prize Shortlisted for Gilgamesh
 2009: New South Wales Premier's Literary Awards Christina Stead Prize for Fiction for The Good Parents
 2015: Prime Minister's Literary Award for The Golden Age
 2015: Patrick White Award
 2015: Nita Kibble Literary Award for The Golden Age
 2015: Miles Franklin Award shortlisted for The Golden Age

References

External links
Joan London at Random House Australia
Middlemiss Page on Gilgamesh
Review of The Golden Age, with portrait

See also
 Wilde, W., Hooton, J. & Andrews, B (1994) The Oxford Companion of Australian Literature 2nd ed. South Melbourne, Oxford University Press

1948 births
21st-century Australian novelists
Australian women short story writers
Australian women novelists
20th-century Australian women writers
Writers from Perth, Western Australia
Living people
University of Western Australia alumni
21st-century Australian women writers
20th-century Australian short story writers
21st-century Australian short story writers